The Rolling Stone Album Guide, previously known as The Rolling Stone Record Guide, is a book that contains professional music reviews written and edited by staff members from Rolling Stone magazine. Its first edition was published in 1979 and its last in 2004. The guide can be seen at Rate Your Music, while a list of albums given a five star rating by the guide can be seen at Rocklist.net.

First edition (1979)
The Rolling Stone Record Guide was the first edition of what would later become The Rolling Stone Album Guide. It was edited by Dave Marsh (who wrote a large majority of the reviews) and John Swenson, and included contributions from 34 other music critics. It is divided into sections by musical genre and then lists artists alphabetically within their respective genres. Albums are also listed alphabetically by artist although some of the artists have their careers divided into chronological periods.

Dave Marsh, in his Introduction, cites as precedents Leonard Maltin's book TV movies and Robert Christgau's review column in the Village Voice.
He gives Phonolog and Schwann's Records & Tape Guide as raw sources of information.

The first edition included black and white photographs of many of the covers of albums which received five star reviews. These titles are listed together in the Five-Star Records section, which is coincidentally five pages in length.

The edition also included reviews for many comedy artists including Lenny Bruce, Lord Buckley, Bill Cosby, The Firesign Theatre, Spike Jones, and Richard Pryor.

Comedy artists were listed in the catch-all section "Rock, Soul, Country and Pop", which included the genres of folk (Carter Family, Woody Guthrie, Leadbelly), bluegrass (Bill Monroe), funk (The Meters, Parliament-Funkadelic), and reggae (Toots & the Maytals, Peter Tosh), as well as comedy. Traditional pop performers were not included (e.g. Andrews Sisters, Tony Bennett, Perry Como, Bing Crosby, Peggy Lee, Rudy Vallee, Lawrence Welk), with the notable exceptions of Frank Sinatra and Nat King Cole. (Dave Marsh justified this decision in his Introduction.)

Included too were some difficult-to-classify artists (e.g. Osibisa, Yma Sumac, Urubamba) who might now be considered as world music. (Ethnic music was the normal term in 1979.)

Big band jazz was handled selectively, with certain band leaders omitted (e.g. Tommy Dorsey, Glenn Miller, Paul Whiteman), while others were included (e.g. Count Basie, Cab Calloway, Duke Ellington, Benny Goodman). Many other styles of jazz did appear in the Jazz section.

The book was notable for the time in the provocative, "in your face" style of many of its reviews. For example, writing about Neil Young's song, "Down by the River", John Swenson described it both as an "FM radio classic" (p. 425), and as a "wimp anthem" (p. 244). His colleague, Dave Marsh, in reviewing the three albums of the jazz fusion group Chase, gave a one-word review: "Flee." Marsh's review of a then-current rock band called Platypus stated simply: "Lays eggs."

Table of contents 
 Introduction
 Rock, Soul, Country and Pop
 Blues
 Jazz
 Gospel
 Anthologies, Soundtracks and Original Casts
 Five-Star Records
 Glossary
 Selected Bibliography

Rating system 
The guide employs a five star rating scale with the following descriptions of those ratings:
 
 Indispensable: a record that must be included in any comprehensive collection
 
 Excellent: a record of substantial merit, though flawed in some essential way.
 
 Good: a record of average worth, but one that might possess considerable appeal for fans of a particular style.
 
 Mediocre: a record that is artistically insubstantial, though not truly wretched.
 
 Poor: a record where even technical competence is at question or it was remarkably ill-conceived. 
 
 Worthless: a record that need never (or should never) have been created. Reserved for the most bathetic bathwater. (A square bullet (▪) marked this rating, as opposed to stars for the others.)

Reviewers 

 Dave Marsh
 John Swenson
 Billy Altman
 Bob Blumenthal
 Georgia Christgau
 Jean-Charles Costa
 Chet Flippo
 Russell Gersten
 Mikal Gilmore
 Alan E. Goodman
 Peter Herbst
 Stephen Holden
 Martha Hume
 Gary Kenton
 Bruce Malamut
 Greil Marcus
 Ira Mayer
Joe McEwen
David McGee
John Milward
Teri Morris
John Morthland
Paul Nelson
Alan Niester
Rob Patterson
Kit Rachlis
Wayne Robbins
Frank Rose
Michael Rozek
Fred Schruers
Tom Smucker
Ariel Swartley
Ken Tucker
Charley Walters

Second edition (1983)

The New Rolling Stone Record Guide was an update of 1979's The Rolling Stone Record Guide. Like the first edition, it was edited by Marsh and Swenson. It included contributions from 52 music critics and featured chronological album listings under the name of each artist. In many cases, updates from the first edition consist of short, one-sentence verdicts upon an artist's later work.

Instead of having separate sections such as Blues and Gospel, this edition compressed all of the genres it reviewed into one section except for Jazz titles which were removed for this edition and were later expanded and published in 1985 Rolling Stone Jazz Record Guide (ed. Swenson). Besides adding reviews for many emerging  punk and New Wave bands, this edition also added or expanded a significant number of reviews of long-established reggae and ska artists (such as U-Roy, Prince Buster, Ijahman, et al.).

Since the goal of this guide was to review records that were in print at the time of publication, this edition featured a list of artists who were included in the first edition but were not included in the second edition because all of their material was out of print. This edition also dispensed with the album cover photos found in the first edition.

Table of contents
Introduction to the Second Edition
Introduction to the First Edition
Ratings
Reviewers
Record Label Abbreviations
Rock, Soul, Blues, Country, Gospel and Pop
Anthologies, Soundtracks and Original Cast
Index to Artists in the First Edition (omitted in this second edition)

Rating system
The second edition uses exactly the same rating system as the first edition, the only difference being that in addition to a rating, the second edition also employs the pilcrow mark (¶) to indicate a title that was out of print at the time the guide was published. Many albums had their rating revised from the first edition; some artists had their ratings lowered (notably The Doors, Yes and Neil Young) as the book now offered a revisionist slant to rock's history, whilst others, such as Little Feat and Richard Hell And The Voidoids, garnered higher ratings from a re-evaluation of their work.

Reviewers

Dave Marsh
John Swenson
Billy Altman
George Arthur
Lester Bangs
Bob Blumenthal
J.D. Considine
Jean-Charles Costa
Brian Cullman
Dan Doyle
Jim Farber
Laura Fissinger
Chet Flippo
David Fricke
Aaron Fuchs
Steve Futterman
Debbie Geller
Russell Gersten
Mikal Gilmore
Alan E. Goodman
Randall Grass
Malu Halasa
Peter Herbst
Stephen Holden
Martha Hume
Scott Isler
Gary Kenton
Wayne King
Kenn Lowy
Bruce Malamut
Greil Marcus
Ira Mayer
Joe McEwen
David McGee
John Milward
Teri Morris
John Morthland
Paul Nelson
Alan Niester
Rob Patterson
Kit Rachlis
Ira Robbins
Wayne Robbins
Frank Rose
Michael Rozek
Fred Schruers
Dave Schulpas
Tom Smucker
Ariel Swartley
Bart Testa
Ken Tucker
Charley Walters

The Rolling Stone Jazz Record Guide (1985)

The Rolling Stone Jazz Record Guide was published in 1985  and incorporated the jazz listings omitted from The New Rolling Stone Record Guide with additional reviews edited by John Swenson. It included contributions from 16 music critics and featured alphabetical album listings under the name of each artist.

Table of contents
Foreword
Preface
Ratings
Contributors
Record Label Abbreviations
Reviews
Bibliography

Rating system
This jazz edition uses the same rating system as the first two editions.

Contributors

John Swenson
Bob Blumenthal
Jean-Charles Costa
Steve Futterman
Russell Gersten
Mikal Gilmore
Alan E. Goodman
Fred Goodman
Stephen Holden
Ashley Kahn
Bruce Malamut
Joe McEwen
Michael Rozek
Andy Rowan
Bart Testa
Charley Walters

Third edition (1992) 

The Rolling Stone Album Guide was a complete rewrite of both 1979's The Rolling Stone Record Guide and 1983's The New Rolling Stone Record Guide. The title change reflects the fact that by the time this edition was published in 1992, records were almost completely replaced by cassettes and CDs. This edition employs three new editors and reduces the number of reviewers from more than 50 as seen in previous editions to a mere four. This edition also included reviews of Jazz albums, which had been removed from the previous edition for the sake of publishing a separate Jazz guide. Unlike both previous editions, this edition did not include comedy artists.

Table of contents
Introduction
Ratings
Contributors
The Rolling Stone Album Guide
Anthologies
Soundtracks
Acknowledgments

Rating system
Similar to the first edition, it employed a five star rating scale (without the "zero stars" (▪) rating), but this edition had new definitions of what the number of stars meant, and employed the use of 1/2 stars in the reviews. The descriptions of the markings used in the third edition of the guide are:

Classic: Albums in this category are essential listening for anyone interested in the artist under discussion or the style of music that artist's work represents.

Excellent: Four star albums represent peak performances in an artist's career. Generally speaking, albums that are granted four or more stars constitute the best introductions to an artist's work for listeners who are curious.

Average to Good: Albums in the three-star range will primarily be of interest to established fans of the artist being discussed. This mid-range, by its very nature, requires the most discretion on the part of the consumer.

Fair to Poor: Albums in the two-star category either fall below an artist's established standard or are, in and of themselves, failures.

Disastrous: Albums in the range of one star or less are wastes of vital resources. Only masochists or completists need apply.

Reviewers
Mark Coleman
J.D. Considine
Paul Evans
David McGee

Artists omitted from the third edition
Some of the artists included in the previous editions but omitted in this edition include:

 Kevin Coyne
 Dexys Midnight Runners
 Roy Harper
 Hawkwind
 Japan
 Magma
 Mickey Newbury
 Olivia Newton-John
 Pearls Before Swine
 Pere Ubu
 The Pretty Things
 The Red Krayola
 Scorpions
 Slade
 Steeleye Span
 Three Dog Night
 Van der Graaf Generator
 John Williams

The Rolling Stone Jazz & Blues Album Guide (1999)
The Rolling Stone Jazz & Blues Album Guide was first published by Random House in 1999, with John Swenson as the editor.

Reviewing the book for All About Jazz, C. Michael Bailey regarded it as a consolidation of the 1985 jazz guide and the blues coverage from other Rolling Stone guides. He recommended it to novices, calling it "a worthy addition to any serious jazz/blues collector's library", even though it was not as comprehensive as The Penguin Guide to Jazz or All Music Guide to Jazz, in his opinion.

Fourth edition (2004)

Approximately 70 writers contributed to this edition. Text on the back cover of the fourth edition claims that the guide had been "completely updated and revised to include the past decade's artists and sounds", and offered "biographical overviews of key artists' careers, giving readers a look at the personalities behind the music".

Artists omitted from the fourth edition
Some of the artists included in the previous guides but omitted in this edition include:

 Joan Armatrading
 Louis Armstrong
 Aztec Camera
 Blake Babies
 Bread
 Captain Beefheart
 Joe Cocker
 Nat King Cole
 Crowded House
 Robert Cray
 Culture
 The Damned
 Deep Purple
 John Denver
 The Doobie Brothers
 Dr. Feelgood
 Duke Ellington
 Donald Fagen
 Ella Fitzgerald
 Emerson, Lake and Palmer
 GTR
 The Gun Club
 Janis Ian
 Incredible String Band
 Grace Jones
 Loggins and Messina
 Robert Johnson
 Wynton Marsalis
 Meat Puppets
 Metallica (omitted from first printing, but added later) 
 Mike and the Mechanics
 The Alan Parsons Project                                        
 Pentangle
 The Raspberries
 The Saints
 Soft Machine
 Sparks
 Suicide
 Talk Talk
 Tears for Fears
 Thompson Twins
 Toto
 Uriah Heep

See also 

 Album era
 Christgau's Record Guide: Rock Albums of the Seventies
 Christgau's Record Guide: The '80s
 Rockism and poptimism
 Spin Alternative Record Guide

References

Citations
  The Rolling Stone Record Guide. Ed. Dave Marsh and John Swenson. New York: Random House, 1979. (Note 1, see p xiii) (Note 1a, see p xv-xvi)
   The New Rolling Stone Record Guide. Ed. Dave Marsh and John Swenson. New York: Random House, 1983. (Note 2, see p 645-648) (Note 2a, see p xv) (Note 2b, see p xvii-xix)
  The Rolling Stone Album Guide. Ed. Anthony DeCurtis and James Henke with Holly George-Warren. New York: Random House, 1992. (Note 3, see p vii) (Note 3a, see ix)

Further reading

External links 
Copies of the 1st, 2nd, and 4th editions are available to loan through the Internet Archive and Open Library :
 The Rolling Stone Record Guide, 1st ed. (1979) at the Internet Archive and Open Library
 The New Rolling Stone Record Guide, 2nd ed. (1983) at the Internet Archive and Open Library
 The New Rolling Stone Album Guide, 4th ed. (2004) at the Internet Archive and Open Library

Encyclopedias of music
1979 non-fiction books
Rolling Stone
Music guides
Books of music criticism